Arjun Jena is an Indian cinematographer from Chennai.

Career

Early days 
During the 1990s, Jena joined cinematographer P. C. Sreeram's unit as an assistant cameraman. He worked under Sreeram in films such as Thevar Magan (1992), Thiruda Thiruda (1993), May Madham (1994), Subha Sankalpam (1994) and Kurudhipunal (1995). Later in 1996, he joined cinematographer Jeeva, a former assistant of Sreeram, as an operating cameraman. He apprenticed under Jeeva in Indian (1996), Ullasam (1997), Vaali (1999), Kushi (2000), Run (2002), Zor, Hera Pheri and Yeh Teraa Ghar Yeh Meraa Ghar.

Independent work 
Jena got his first break with the short film Silent Scream, directed by Vikram Kumar. It won the National Film Award for Best Educational/Motivational/Instructional Film at the 46th National Film Awards in 1998. He made his feature film debut with Kathir's Tamil feature film Kadhal Virus (2000), which won him the Tamil Nadu State Film Award for Best Cinematographer. His other works include Oka Oorilo, Aegan, Love Khichdi and Ala Modalaindi.

Filmography

References

External links

 http://odishasuntimes.com/tulasi-apa-first-odia-biopic-to-inspire-generations/
 https://timesofindia.indiatimes.com/city/bhubaneswar/Ashok-Swain-to-receive-Jaydev-Samman/articleshow/55642243.cms
 http://m.behindwoods.com/tamil-movies/koditta-idangalai-nirappuga/koditta-idangalai-nirappuga-review.html
 https://www.ibtimes.co.in/koditta-idangalai-nirappuga-kin-movie-review-live-audience-response-712142

1971 births
Living people
Cinematographers from Tamil Nadu
Tamil film cinematographers
Best Cinematography National Film Award winners
M.G.R. Government Film and Television Training Institute alumni
Artists from Chennai
Telugu film cinematographers
21st-century Indian photographers
Tamil Nadu State Film Awards winners